Brassite is a rare arsenate mineral with the chemical formula Mg(AsO3OH)·4(H2O). It was named brassite, in 1973, to honor French chemist R`ejane Brasse, who first synthesized the compound. The type locality for brassite is Jáchymov of the Czech Republic.

It occurs as an alteration of magnesium carbonate minerals by arsenic bearing solutions. It occurs associated with pharmacolite, picropharmacolite, weilite, haidingerite, rauenthalite, native arsenic, realgar and dolomite.

Localities

Czech Republic:
Jáchymov (St Joachimsthal), Jáchymov, Krušné Hory Mts (Erzgebirge), Karlovy Vary Region, Bohemia, Czech Republic

France:
Salsigne mine, Salsigne, Mas-Cabardès, Carcassonne, Aude, Languedoc-Roussillon, France
Villanière (slag locality), Salsigne, Mas-Cabardès, Carcassonne, Aude, Languedoc-Roussillon, France

Germany:
Wilhelm Mine (Wechselschacht), Bauhaus, Richelsdorf District, Hesse, Germany
Ore dumps, Richelsdorf Smelter, Süss, Richelsdorf District, Hesse, Germany

References 

Magnesium minerals
Arsenate minerals
Orthorhombic minerals
Minerals in space group 61